The 1853 Connecticut gubernatorial election was held on April 4, 1853. Incumbent governor and Democratic Party nominee Thomas H. Seymour defeated former state legislator and Whig nominee Henry Dutton and former state legislator and Free Soil nominee Francis Gillette with 51.01% of the vote. 

Seymour would resign on October 13, 1853, to become Minister to Russia, and Lieutenant Governor Charles H. Pond served as acting governor until the following May.

General election

Candidates
Major party candidates

Thomas H. Seymour, Democratic
Henry Dutton, Whig

Minor party candidates

Francis Gillette, Free Soil

Results

References

1853
Connecticut
Gubernatorial